The Stephen F. Austin Lumberjacks football program is the intercollegiate American football team for Stephen F. Austin State University (SFA) located in the U.S. state of Texas. The team competes in the NCAA Division I Football Championship Subdivision (FCS) as members of the ASUN–WAC Football Conference. The ASUN–WAC, newly formed for the 2023 season, is a merger of the football leagues of SFA's full-time home of the Western Athletic Conference (WAC) and the ASUN Conference. It replaces an alliance between the two conferences that operated in the 2021 and 2022 seasons.

SFA had long been a member of the Southland Conference (SLC) before joining the WAC in July 2021, the same time that conference relaunched its football league at the FCS level. Stephen F. Austin's first football team was fielded in 1923. The team plays its home games at the 14,575 seat Homer Bryce Stadium in Nacogdoches, Texas.

Conference championships

† Co-champions

Head coaches

 Bob Shelton (1923–1928)
 Gene White (1929–1936)
 Red Willis (1937–1940)
 Maurice A. Baumgarten (1941)
 No team (1942–1945)
 Bill Pierce (1946)
 Ted Jefferies (1947–1955)
 Harold J. Fischer (1956–1958)
 Red Conkright (1959–1961)
 Shorty Hughes (1962–1970)
 John Levra (1971–1974)
 Dick Munzinger (1975)
 Charles Simmons (1976–1981)
 Jim Hess (1982–1988)
 Lynn Graves (1989–1991)
 John Pearce (1992–1998)
 Mike Santiago (1999–2004)
 Robert McFarland (2005–2006)
 J. C. Harper (2007–2013)
 Clint Conque (2014–2017)
 Jeff Byrd (interim) (2018)
 Colby Carthel (2019–present)

Notable former players

Notable alumni include:
:

 Bruce Alexander
 Derrick Blaylock
 Larry Centers
 KaRon Coleman
 Spike Dykes
 John Franklin-Myers
 Todd Hammel
 Sam Hunt

 Willie Jefferson
 Mark Moseley
 Bum Phillips
 Mike Quinn
 James Ritchey
 George Shirkey
 Jeremiah Trotter
 Ben Wells

Postseason history
The Lumberjacks earned a berth in the FCS playoffs in 2009, the first postseason appearance for the team since 1995. The 2010 season marked the first time that the school had won an outright conference championship since 1989.

The team's only bowl game was the 1973 Poultry Bowl, in which the team defeated Gardner-Webb, 31–10, in Gainesville, Georgia.

Division I-AA/FCS Playoffs results
The Lumberjacks have appeared in the I-AA/FCS playoffs eight times with an overall record of 7–8.

Rivalries
The Lumberjacks have active rivalries with the Northwestern State Demons and the Sam Houston Bearkats.

Future non-conference opponents 
Announced schedules as of December 4, 2022. Austin Peay, announced as a non-conference opponent for 2024 and 2025, became a conference opponent with the ASUN–WAC football merger.

References

External links
 

 
American football teams established in 1923
1923 establishments in Texas